Europia may refer to:

 Europium(III) oxide a chemical
 Europia an epic poem by Eumelus of Corinth

See also
Europa (disambiguation)